Lists of comedies cover comedy performances in different media and genres.

Media
Lists of comedy films
List of comedy television series
List of comedy-drama television series
List of radio comedies
List of theatrical comedies

Genre
List of comedy horror films
List of comedy–mystery films
List of comedy anime
List of science fiction comedy films
List of romantic comedy films
List of situation comedies
List of teen sitcoms